Werda is a village in Kgalagadi District of Botswana. It is located close to the border with South Africa. The population was 3261 in 2011 census.

References

Kgalagadi District
Villages in Botswana